Ciliary neurotrophic factor is a protein that in humans is encoded by the CNTF gene.

The protein encoded by this gene is a polypeptide hormone and  neurotrophic factor whose actions have mainly been studied in the nervous system where it promotes neurotransmitter synthesis and neurite outgrowth in certain neural populations including astrocytes. It is a hypothalamic neuropeptide that is a potent survival factor for neurons and oligodendrocytes and may be relevant in reducing tissue destruction during inflammatory attacks. A mutation in this gene, which results in aberrant splicing, leads to ciliary neurotrophic factor deficiency, but this phenotype is not causally related to neurologic disease. In addition to the predominant monocistronic transcript originating from this locus, the gene is also cotranscribed with the upstream ZFP91 gene. Cotranscription from the two loci results in a transcript that contains a complete coding region for the zinc finger protein but lacks a complete coding region for ciliary neurotrophic factor.

CNTF has also been shown to be expressed by cells on the bone surface, and to reduce the activity of bone-forming cells (osteoblasts).

Therapeutic applications

Satiety effects 

In 2001, it was reported that in a human study examining the usefulness of CNTF for treatment of motor neuron disease, CNTF produced an unexpected and substantial weight loss in the study subjects. Further investigation revealed that CNTF could reduce food intake without causing hunger or stress, making it a candidate for weight control in leptin-resistant subjects, as CNTF is believed to operate like leptin, but by a non-leptin pathway.

Recombinant human CNTF (Axokine) 
A recombinant version of human CNTF (rhCNTF), trade name Axokine, is a modified version with a 15 amino acid truncation of the C-terminus and two amino acid substitutions. It is three to five times more potent than CNTF in in vitro and in vivo assays and has improved stability properties.  Like CNTF it is a neurotrophic factor, and may stimulate nerve cells to survive.  It was tested in the 1990s as a treatment for amyotrophic lateral sclerosis. It did not improve muscle control as much as expected, but trial participants did report a loss of appetite.

Phase III clinical trials for the drug against obesity were conducted in 2003 by Axokine's maker, Regeneron Pharmaceuticals, demonstrating a small positive effect in some patients, but the drug was not commercialized.  A major problem with the treatment was that in nearly 70% of the subjects tested, antibodies against Axokine were produced after approximately three months of treatment.  In the minority of subjects who did not develop the antibodies, weight loss averaged 12.5 pounds in one year, versus 4.5 pounds for placebo-treated subjects.  In order to obtain this benefit, subjects needed to receive daily subcutaneous injections of one microgram Axokine per kilogram body weight.

Xencor patent application raises the disturbing idea that subjects producing antibodies against CNTF analogues may eventually suffer severe adverse effects, as these antibodies could potentially interfere with the neuroprotective functions of endogenous CNTF. The application claims methods of designing CNTF analogues with lower immunogenicity than Axokine based on analysis of affinity of each modified epitope for each of 52 class II MHC alleles, and provides specific examples of such modifications.  No such analogues are currently listed in Xencor's product pipeline.

NT-501 

NT-501 is a product being developed by Neurotech that consists of encapsulated human cells genetically modified to secrete ciliary neurotrophic factor (CNTF). In a clinical trial, NT-501 demonstrated a statistically significant reduction of photoreceptor degradation in patients with retinitis pigmentosa.

Interactions
Human ciliary neurotrophic factor has been shown to interact with the Interleukin 6 receptor.

See also
 Ciliary neurotrophic factor receptor
 Interleukin 6
 George Yancopoulos

References

Further reading

External links
 
 

Neurotrophic factors
Peptide hormones
Proteins
Developmental neuroscience